Vorkreist is a French blackened death metal band based in Paris that shares members with the black metal bands Antaeus and Hell Militia. "Vorkreist" is a barbarism created by the band that supposedly means Antichrist.

Biography 
After a demo in 2001, Vorkreist released their first album, Sabbathical Flesh Possession, in 2003, to lukewarm reviews.

In 2006, they released their second album, Sublimation XXIXA, which received more positive reviews. They toured Europe in September 2007 with Blacklodge and Horna.

Members

Current members 
Johannes "A.K." Judicaël – guitar (1999-)
Dave "D. Terror" – drums (2005-)
Hervé "EsX" – guitar (2007-)
Saint Vincent – vocals (2009-)
Narcotic – bass (2013-)

Former members 
Mihai aka Aseal – drums (1999–2004)
Silmaeth – guitar (1999–2007)
Andralath "Sohr-Khasm" Svartsinn – vocals (1999–2009)
Marianne "LSK" Séjourné – bass (1999–2013; died 2013)

Discography 
Studio albums

References

External links 

 Band website
 Band entry on Encyclopaedia Metallum
 Interview on Vampire-magazine

French black metal musical groups
French death metal musical groups
Musical groups established in 1999
Musical groups from Paris
1999 establishments in France